Elias Kolega (born 23 May 1996) is a retired Croatian alpine ski racer, who competed primarily in slalom events.

He competed at the 2015 World Championships in Beaver Creek, USA, in the giant slalom.

He is the brother of fellow alpine skier Samuel Kolega. In April 2017 it was announced that the brothers would be coached by Ante Kostelić.

In February 2020, he suffered an open leg fracture, went through surgery and rehabilitation only to be injured again in October of the same year.
Due to his struggle with injuries, he stopped skiing in 2020, and in April 2022 retired from professional skiing.

World Cup results

Season standings

Results per discipline

 standings through 20 Mar 2022

World Championship results

Olympic results

References

External links

1996 births
Croatian male alpine skiers
Living people
Alpine skiers at the 2018 Winter Olympics
Olympic alpine skiers of Croatia
Skiers from Munich